The Chumburu are part of the Guan ethnic group in Ghana and are located in three regions:Northern, Volta and Brong-Ahafo region of Ghana. They are indigenous in three Regions of Ghana: 
 In Northern Ghana, they are located in Kpandai District
 In Oti, they are dominant in Krachi East, Krachi West and Krachi-Chumburung Districts 
 And in Brong-Ahafo, they are dominant in Yeji, Pru and Atebobu Districts.
Both traditional areas of Chumburung in Brong-Ahafo and Volta regions are on the shores of Lake Volta.

The Chumburu speak the Chumburung language.

References

Ethnic groups in Ghana
History of Ghana
Former monarchies of Africa
Northern Region (Ghana)
Brong-Ahafo Region
Former countries in Africa